Janakpur Airport  is an airport serving Janakpur, a city in Mithila region of Nepal and the administrative headquarters of the Dhanusa District in Madhesh Province in Nepal.

Facilities

The airport is capable to handle aircraft from the Nepalese Army Air Service.

No facilities are available in the airport premise. There are very few shops inside the airport premise.

Airlines and destinations

See also
List of airports in Nepal

References

External links
 

Airports in Nepal
Dhanusha District
Buildings and structures in Janakpur